The 1996–97 NBA season was the Jazz's 23rd season in the National Basketball Association, and 18th season in Salt Lake City, Utah. Prior to the start of the season, the Jazz changed their primary logo that more closely reflects the state of Utah, featuring purple mountains and light blue in the script, plus adding new uniforms. The new colors seemed to agree with the Jazz as they went on a 15-game winning streak between November and December after a 2–2 start to the season. With a 33–14 record at midseason, the Jazz then posted a 31–4 record after the All-Star break, where they posted another 15-game winning streak between March and April, winning 19 of their final 20 games, and finishing first place in the Western Conference with a franchise best record of 64–18. They made their fourteenth consecutive trip to the playoffs. The team also had the second best home record in the league with a 38–3 record at the Delta Center.

Karl Malone averaged 27.4 points, 9.9 rebounds, 4.5 assists and 1.4 steals per game as he took home MVP honors, finishing in first place ahead of Michael Jordan in Most Valuable Player voting, while being named to the All-NBA First Team and NBA All-Defensive First Team. In addition, John Stockton averaged 14.4 points, led the league with 10.5 assists, and contributed 2.0 steals per game, and was named to the All-NBA Third Team, and NBA All-Defensive Second Team. Both Malone and Stockton were selected for the 1997 NBA All-Star Game. Jeff Hornacek provided the team with 14.5 points and 1.5 steals per game, while Bryon Russell showed improvement becoming the team's starting small forward, averaging 10.8 points and 1.4 steals per game, second-year center Greg Ostertag averaged 7.3 points and rebounds per game each, and led the team with 2.0 blocks per game, and Antoine Carr contributed 7.4 points per game off the bench. Head coach Jerry Sloan finished in third place in Coach of the Year voting.

In the playoffs, the Jazz got off to a flying start in the Western Conference First Round sweeping the Los Angeles Clippers in three straight games. In the Western Conference Semi-finals, they continued to roll easily knocking the Los Angeles Lakers four games to one. In the Western Conference Finals, they took a 2–0 series lead over the Houston Rockets, who were led by Hakeem Olajuwon, Charles Barkley and Clyde Drexler. However, the Rockets would even the series at two games a piece, as Rockets forward Eddie Johnson hit a dramatic three-pointer at the buzzer to win Game 4, 95–92. After the Jazz took Game 5 at home, 96–91, Game 6 would be another battle and appeared to be heading for overtime, until Stockton nailed a three-point buzzer beater that launched the Jazz to the NBA Finals for the first time in franchise history, defeating the Rockets on the road, 103–100. In their first trip to the finals, the Jazz lost in six games to Jordan, Scottie Pippen and the defending champion Chicago Bulls.

One notable highlight of the season was the Jazz trailing 70–36 at halftime to the Denver Nuggets at home on November 27, 1996, but came back from a 34-point deficit, outscoring the Nuggets 71–33 in the second half to win the game, 107–103. The Jazz's new primary logo and uniforms would both remain in use until 2004.

Draft picks

Roster

Roster Notes
 Small forward Jamie Watson was waived on March 5.

Regular season

Season standings

z – clinched division title
y – clinched division title
x – clinched playoff spot

Record vs. opponents

Game log

|- style="background:#bfb;"
| 1 || November 1 || Seattle || W 99–91 || Karl Malone (27) || Karl Malone (13) || Stockton & Hornacek (8) || Delta Center19,911 || 1–0
|-
|- style="background:#bfb;"
| 2 || November 2 || @ L.A. Clippers || W 95–90 || Karl Malone (21) || Karl Malone (12) || John Stockton (7) || Los Angeles Memorial Sports Arena13,041 || 2–0
|-
|- style="background:#fbb;"
| 3 || November 4 || Houston || L 72–75 || Karl Malone (16) || Karl Malone (14) || Jeff Hornacek (5) || Delta Center19,911 || 2–1
|-
|- style="background:#fbb;"
| 4 || November 9 || @ Houston || L 85–91 || Karl Malone (32) || Karl Malone (11) || John Stockton (6) || The Summit16,285 || 2–2
|-
|- style="background:#bfb;"
| 5 || November 13 || Sacramento || W 105–74 || Karl Malone (22) || Greg Ostertag (13) || John Stockton (10) || Delta Center19,283 || 3–2
|-
|- style="background:#bfb;"
| 6 || November 15 || Vancouver || W 104–96 || Karl Malone (21) || Greg Ostertag (20) || John Stockton (18) || Delta Center19,046 || 4–2
|-
|- style="background:#bfb;"
| 7 || November 16 || @ Dallas || W 88–87 || John Stockton (23) || Bryon Russell (13) || John Stockton (8) || Reunion Arena15,947 || 5–2
|-
|- style="background:#bfb;"
| 8 || November 20 || @ L.A. Lakers || W 113–97 || Karl Malone (37) || Greg Ostertag (9) || John Stockton (13) || Great Western Fourm16,122 || 6–2
|-
|- style="background:#bfb;"
| 9 || November 21 || Golden State || W 109–104 (OT) || || || || Delta Center18,889 || 7–2
|-
|- style="background:#bfb;"
| 10 || November 23 || Chicago || W105–100 || || || || Delta Center19,911 || 8–2
|-
|- style="background:#bfb;"
| 11 || November 25 || New Jersey || W 108–92 || || || || Delta Center19,132 || 9–2
|-
|- style="background:#bfb;"
| 12 || November 27 || Denver || W 107–103 || || || || Delta Center19,324 || 10–2
|-
|- style="background:#bfb;"
| 13 || November 29 || L.A. Clippers || W 111–94 || || || || Delta Center19,381 || 11–2
|-

|- style="background:#bfb;"
| 14 || Dec 1 || at Seattle SuperSonics || 96-90 W || || || || KeyArena at Seattle Center/17,072 || 12-2
|- style="background:#bfb;"
| 15 || Dec 2 || vs Charlotte Hornets || 107-97 W || || || || Delta Center/19,410 || 13-2
|- style="background:#bfb;"
| 16 || Dec 4 || vs Los Angeles Lakers || 101-75 W || || || || Delta Center/19,911 || 14-2
|- style="background:#bfb;"
| 17 || Dec 6 || vs Minnesota Timberwolves || 106-95 W || || || || Delta Center/19,911 || 15-2
|- style="background:#bfb;"
| 18 || Dec 7 || at Denver Nuggets || 104-91 W || || || || McNichols Sports Arena/12,837 || 16-2
|- style="background:#bfb;"
| 19 || Dec 10 || vs Indiana Pacers || 110-86 W || || || || Delta Center/19,911 || 17-2
|- style="background:#fbb;"
| 20 || Dec 12 || vs Phoenix Suns || 87-95 L || || || || Delta Center/19,911 || 17-3
|- style="background:#bfb;"
| 21 || Dec 14 || vs Orlando Magic || 101-68 W || || || || Delta Center/19,911 || 18-3
|- style="background:#fbb;"
| 22 || Dec 17 || at New York Knicks || 94-99 L || || || || Madison Square Garden/19,763 || 18-4
|- style="background:#bfb;"
| 23 || Dec 19 || at Miami Heat || 94-87 W OT || || || || Miami Arena/14,919 || 19-4
|- style="background:#bfb;"
| 24 || Dec 20 || at Orlando Magic || 98-93 W || || || || Orlando Arena/17,248 || 20-4
|- style="background:#fbb;"
| 25 || Dec 22 || at Cleveland Cavaliers || 94-100 L || || || || Gund Arena/17,205 || 20-5
|- style="background:#fbb;"
| 26 || Dec 23 || at Minnesota Timberwolves || 98-107 L || || || || Target Center/14,434 || 20-6
|- style="background:#bfb;"
| 27 || Dec 26 || vs Portland Trail Blazers || 99-94 W || || || || Delta Center/19,911 || 21-6
|- style="background:#bfb;"
| 28 || Dec 28 || vs Philadelphia 76ers || 110-84 W || || || || Delta Center/19,911 || 22-6
|- style="background:#fbb;"
| 29 || Dec 30 || at Los Angeles Clippers || 101-115 L || || || || Los Angeles Memorial Sports Arena || 22-7
|-

|- style="background:#fbb;"
| 30 || Jan 2 || at San Antonio Spurs || 80-83 L || || || || Alamodome/15,220 || 22-8
|- style="background:#bfb;"
| 31 || Jan 4 || vs Miami Heat || 83-80 W || || || || Delta Center || 23-8
|-
|- style="background:#fbb;"
| 32 || Jan 6 || at Chicago Bulls || 89-102 L || || || || United Center || 23-9
|-
|- style="background:#fbb;"
| 33 || Jan 8 || at Milwaukee Bucks || 112-119 L OT || || || || Bradley Center || 23-10
|-
|- style="background:#fbb;"
| 34 || Jan 9 || at Toronto Raptors || 96-110 L || || || || SkyDome || 23-11
|-
|- style="background:#fbb;"
| 35 || Jan 11 || at Detroit Pistons || 77-87 L || || || || The Palace of Auburn Hills || 23-12
|-
|- style="background:#bfb;"
| 36 || Jan 13 || at Philadelphia 76ers || 97-96 W OT || || || || CoreStates Center || 24-12
|-
|- style="background:#bfb;"
| 37 || Jan 16 || vs Phoenix Suns || 95-91 W || || || || Delta Center || 25-12
|-
|- style="background:#bfb;"
| 38 || Jan 17 || at Vancouver Grizzlies || 106-68 W || || || || General Motors Place || 26-12
|-
|- style="background:#fbb;"
| 39 || Jan 19 || at Portland Trail Blazers || 96-102 L || || || || Rose Garden Arena || 26-13
|-
|- style="background:#bfb;"
| 40 || Jan 20 || vs Cleveland Cavaliers || 94-74 W || || || || Delta Center || 27-13
|-
|- style="background:#bfb;"
| 41 || Jan 22 || at Phoenix Suns || 111-99 W || || || || America West Arena || 28-13
|-
|- style="background:#bfb;"
| 42 || Jan 25 || at Houston Rockets || 105-100 W OT || || || || The Summit || 29-13
|-
|- style="background:#bfb;"
| 43 || Jan 28 || vs Denver Nuggets || 114-99 W || || || || Delta Center || 30-13
|-
|- style="background:#bfb;"
| 44 || Jan 30 || vs Atlanta Hawks || 102-96 W || || || || Delta Center || 31-13
|-

|- style="background:#fbb;"
| 45 || Feb 1 || at Dallas Mavericks || 97-100 L || || || || Reunion Arena || 31-14
|- style="background:#bfb;"
| 46 || Feb 3 || vs Washington Bullets || 111-89 W || || || || Delta Center || 32-14
|-
|- style="background:#bfb;"
| 47 || Feb 5 || at Seattle SuperSonics || 99-95 W || || || || KeyArena at Seattle Center || 33-14
|-
|- style="background:#bfb;"
| 48 || Feb 11 || at Sacramento Kings || 120-98 W || || || || ARCO Arena || 34-14
|-
|- style="background:#bfb;"
| 49 || Feb 13 || vs Portland Trail Blazers || 110-86 W || || || || Delta Center || 35-14
|-
|- style="background:#bfb;"
| 50 || Feb 15 || vs Dallas Mavericks || 99-84 W || || || || Delta Center || 36-14
|-

|-
| 1996-97 Schedule

Playoffs

|- align="center" bgcolor="#ccffcc"
| 1
| April 24
| L.A. Clippers
| W 106–86
| Karl Malone (27)
| Karl Malone (10)
| John Stockton (17)
| Delta Center19,911
| 1–0
|- align="center" bgcolor="#ccffcc"
| 2
| April 26
| L.A. Clippers
| W 105–99
| Karl Malone (39)
| Karl Malone (11)
| Stockton, Hornacek (4)
| Delta Center19,911
| 2–0
|- align="center" bgcolor="#ccffcc"
| 3
| April 28
| @ L.A. Clippers
| W 104–92
| Karl Malone (26)
| Karl Malone (13)
| John Stockton (13)
| Los Angeles Memorial Sports Arena11,747
| 3–0
|-

|- align="center" bgcolor="#ccffcc"
| 1
| May 4
| L.A. Lakers
| W 93–77
| Karl Malone (23)
| Karl Malone (13)
| Jeff Hornacek (7)
| Delta Center19,911
| 1–0
|- align="center" bgcolor="#ccffcc"
| 2
| May 6
| L.A. Lakers
| W 103–101
| Karl Malone (31)
| Karl Malone (11)
| Hornacek, Stockton (7)
| Delta Center19,911
| 2–0
|- align="center" bgcolor="#ffcccc"
| 3
| May 8
| @ L.A. Lakers
| L 84–104
| Jeff Hornacek (26)
| Karl Malone (10)
| John Stockton (8)
| Great Western Forum17,505
| 2–1
|- align="center" bgcolor="#ccffcc"
| 4
| May 10
| @ L.A. Lakers
| W 110–95
| Bryon Russell (29)
| Bryon Russell (10)
| John Stockton (11)
| Great Western Forum17,505
| 3–1
|- align="center" bgcolor="#ccffcc"
| 5
| May 12
| L.A. Lakers
| W 98–93 (OT)
| Karl Malone (32)
| Karl Malone (20)
| John Stockton (10)
| Delta Center19,911
| 4–1
|-

|- align="center" bgcolor="#ccffcc"
| 1
| May 19
| Houston
| W 101–86
| Karl Malone (21)
| Karl Malone (13)
| John Stockton (13)
| Delta Center19,911
| 1–0
|- align="center" bgcolor="#ccffcc"
| 2
| May 21
| Houston
| W 104–92
| John Stockton (26)
| Karl Malone (15)
| John Stockton (12)
| Delta Center19,911
| 2–0
|- align="center" bgcolor="#ffcccc"
| 3
| May 23
| @ Houston
| L 100–118
| Karl Malone (21)
| Greg Ostertag (9)
| John Stockton (10)
| The Summit16,285
| 2–1
|- align="center" bgcolor="#ffcccc"
| 4
| May 25
| @ Houston
| L 92–95
| Malone, Stockton (22)
| Karl Malone (10)
| John Stockton (8)
| The Summit16,285
| 2–2
|- align="center" bgcolor="#ccffcc"
| 5
| May 27
| Houston
| W 96–91
| Karl Malone (29)
| Karl Malone (14)
| John Stockton (6)
| Delta Center19,911
| 3–2
|- align="center" bgcolor="#ccffcc"
| 6
| May 29
| @ Houston
| W 103–100
| John Stockton (25)
| Greg Ostertag (14)
| John Stockton (13)
| The Summit16,285
| 4–2
|-

|- align="center" bgcolor="#ffcccc"
| 1
| June 1
| @ Chicago
| L 82–84
| Karl Malone (23)
| Karl Malone (15)
| John Stockton (12)
| United Center24,544
| 0–1
|- align="center" bgcolor="#ffcccc"
| 2
| June 4
| @ Chicago
| L 85–97
| Karl Malone (20)
| Karl Malone (13)
| John Stockton (7)
| United Center24,544
| 0–2
|- align="center" bgcolor="#ccffcc"
| 3
| June 6
| Chicago
| W 104–93
| Karl Malone (37)
| Karl Malone (10)
| John Stockton (12)
| Delta Center19,911
| 1–2
|- align="center" bgcolor="#ccffcc"
| 4
| June 8
| Chicago
| W 78–73
| Karl Malone (23)
| Karl Malone (10)
| John Stockton (12)
| Delta Center19,911
| 2–2
|- align="center" bgcolor="#ffcccc"
| 5
| June 11
| Chicago
| L 88–90
| Karl Malone (19)
| Greg Ostertag (15)
| Karl Malone (6)
| Delta Center19,911
| 2–3
|- align="center" bgcolor="#ffcccc"
| 6
| June 13
| @ Chicago
| L 86–90
| Karl Malone (21)
| Greg Ostertag (8)
| John Stockton (5)
| United Center24,544
| 2–4
|-

NBA Finals
In the Finals, the Jazz faced the Chicago Bulls losing the first two games on the road. However, the Jazz upon arriving at the Delta Center continued their home court advantage by taking Game 3, and Game 4 to even the series. With a chance to take a series lead in Game 5, the Jazz were beaten by a heroic performance by Michael Jordan playing with the flu like ailment 90–88. Back in Chicago for Game 6, the Jazz battled the Bulls tightly before falling by four points as the Bulls won their fifth title in seven years.

Player statistics

NOTE: Please write players statistics in alphabetical order by last name.

Season

Playoffs

Awards and records

Awards
 Karl Malone, NBA Most Valuable Player Award
 Karl Malone, All-NBA First Team
 John Stockton, All-NBA Third Team
 Karl Malone, NBA All-Defensive First Team
 John Stockton, NBA All-Defensive Second Team

Records

Transactions

Trades

Free agents

Additions

Subtractions

References

Utah Jazz seasons
Western Conference (NBA) championship seasons
Utah
Utah
Utah